Jerid may refer to:
Djerid, one of the six geographical and economic regions of Tunisia
Jerid (tribe), a Turkoman tribe from Turkey
Jereed, a traditional Turkish equestrian team sport